Tabaw is a small village in Homalin Township, Hkamti District, in the Sagaing Region of northwestern Burma. Tabaw lies on the Chindwin River, to the north of Natset.

References

External links
Maplandia World Gazetteer

Populated places in Hkamti District
Homalin Township